Stenomesson tubiflorum is a species of plant which is endemic to Peru.

S. tubiflorum, which was scientifically named in 1985 as Eucrosia tubiflora, is known only from the type collection in the Marañón basin, an area which had not been explored recently . Like other species of dry habitats, it produces leaves and flowers seasonally and therefore may go unnoticed.

References

Flora of Peru
Amaryllidoideae
Plants described in 1985